P. K. Parakkadavu (Pi. Ke Pār̲akkaṭav) is an Indian writer from Kerala. He was one of the recipients of the 2016 Kerala Sahitya Akademi Awards for overall contribution.

He was born on October 15, 1952 to Ponnankodu Hassan and Maryam in Parakkadavu near Vadakara in Calicut district. He completed his education from Farook College and migrated to the Persian Gulf region for a while to find work. He was the Periodicals Editor of the Madhyamam Daily and the Director of Editorial Relations. He has published thirty-eight books and some of them have been translated into English, Hindi, Arabic, Marathi, Tamil and Telugu. He is a member of the General Council of the Sahitya Akademi and the Executive Committee of the Kerala Sahitya Akademi and the Samastha Kerala Sahitya Parishad. After the murder of writers including Kalburgi, he resigned from Sahitya Akademi to protest against the silence of the central government and the Akademi.

Partial list of works
 Mounathinte Nilavili
 Guruvum Njanum
 Khor Fakkan Kunnu
 Prakasha Naalam
 Manassinte Vathilukal
 Njayarazhcha Nireekshanangal
 Murivetta Vakkukal
 Pranayathinte Nanarthangal
 Parakkadavinte Kathakal
 Iratti Mittayikal
 Thiranjedutha Kathakal
 Idiminnalukalude Pranayam

References

21st-century Indian writers
Recipients of the Kerala Sahitya Akademi Award
Living people
1952 births